938 Chlosinde (prov. designation:  or ) is a carbonaceous Themistian asteroid, approximately  in diameter, from the outer regions of the asteroid belt. It was discovered by astronomer Karl Reinmuth at the Heidelberg Observatory in southwest Germany on 9 September 1920. The C-type asteroid has an ambiguous rotation period of 13.7 or 19.2 hours. It was named "Chlosinde", a common German female name unrelated to the discoverer's contemporaries, that was taken from the almanac Lahrer Hinkender Bote.

Orbit and classification 

When applying the hierarchical clustering method to its proper orbital elements, Chlosinde is a core member of the Themis family, a very large family of carbonaceous asteroids, named after 24 Themis. It orbits the Sun in the outer asteroid belt at a distance of 2.5–3.8 AU once every 5 years and 7 months (2,040 days; semi-major axis of 3.15 AU). Its orbit has an eccentricity of 0.20 and an inclination of 3° with respect to the ecliptic. The body's observation arc begins at Heidelberg Observatory on 10 September 1920, the night after its official discovery observation.

Naming 

This minor planet was named "Chlosinde", after a female name picked from the Lahrer Hinkender Bote, published in Lahr, southern Germany. A Hinkender Bote (lit. "limping messenger") was a very popular almanac, especially in the alemannic-speaking region from the late 17th throughout the early 20th century. The calendar section contains feast days, the dates of important fairs and astronomical ephemerides. For 21 June, the calendar gives "Chlosinde" as the German name day analogue next to Albanus and Aloisius, the protestant and catholic entries in the calendar of saints, likely referring to Saint Alban and Aloysius Gonzaga.

Reinmuth's calendar names 

As with 22 other asteroids – starting with 913 Otila, and ending with 1144 Oda – Reinmuth selected names from this calendar due to his many asteroid discoveries that he had trouble thinking of proper names. These names are not related to the discoverer's contemporaries. Lutz Schmadel, the author of the Dictionary of Minor Planet Names learned about Reinmuth's source of inspiration from private communications with Dutch astronomer Ingrid van Houten-Groeneveld, who worked as a young astronomer at Heidelberg.

Physical characteristics 

In the SDSS-based taxonomy, Chlosinde is a carbonaceous C-type asteroid, which agrees with the Themis family's overall spectral type.

Rotation period 

In August 2010, a rotational lightcurve of Chlosinde was obtained from photometric observations by Robert Stephens at the Santana Observatory  and Goat Mountain Astronomical Research Station  in California. Lightcurve analysis gave a rotation period of  hours with a low brightness variation of  magnitude, indicative of a rather spherical shape. However the result is ambiguous with an alternative period solution of  hours. In September 2010, Larry Owings determined at period of  hours with an amplitude of  magnitude at the Barnes Ridge Observatory in California.

Diameter and albedo 

The Collaborative Asteroid Lightcurve Link derives an albedo of 0.0756 and a diameter of 26.56 km based on an absolute magnitude of 11.3.

References

External links 
 Lightcurve Database Query (LCDB), at www.minorplanet.info
 Dictionary of Minor Planet Names, Google books
 Discovery Circumstances: Numbered Minor Planets (1)-(5000) – Minor Planet Center
 
 

000938
Discoveries by Karl Wilhelm Reinmuth
Named minor planets
19200909